Fiorello may refer to:

Fiorello!, a Broadway musical
Fiorello! (album), a 1960 album by Oscar Peterson
Rosario Fiorello, also known as simply Fiorello, Italian singer and TV host
Giuseppe Fiorello (born 1969), Italian actor of the cinema and television
Vinnie Fiorello (born 1974), American drummer, lyricist and a founding member of the ska punk band Less Than Jake

Fiorello H. La Guardia, former mayor of New York City
Fiorello Giraud (1870–1928), Italian operatic tenor 
Fiorello I and Fiorello II, thoroughbred showjumpers ridden by Raimondo D'Inzeo